The 1926 Utah Agricultural Aggies football team was an American football team that represented Utah Agricultural College (later renamed Utah State University) in the Rocky Mountain Conference (RMC) during the 1926 college football season. In their eighth season under head coach Dick Romney, the Aggies compiled a 5–1–2 record (4–1–2 against RMC opponents), finished third in the conference, and outscored all opponents by a total of 93 to 43.

Two Utah State players received first-team all-conference honors in 1926: guard Robert Gibbons; and tackle Howard Linford.

Schedule

References

Utah Agricultural
Utah State Aggies football seasons
Utah State Aggies football